Ceritaenia ceria is a species of moth of the family Tortricidae. It is found in Rio Grande do Sul, Brazil.

References

Archipini
Moths described in 2000
Moths of South America
Taxa named by Józef Razowski